Philippine literature in English has its roots in the efforts of the United States, then engaged in a war with Filipino nationalist forces at the end of the 19th century. By 1901, public education was institutionalized in the Philippines, with English serving as the medium of instruction. That year, around 600 educators in the S.S. Thomas (the "Thomasites") were tasked to replace the soldiers who had been serving as the first teachers. Outside the academe, the wide availability of reading materials, such as books and newspapers in English, helped Filipinos assimilate the language quickly. Today, 78.53% of the population can understand or speak English (see List of countries by English-speaking population).

The Commonwealth Period
The founding of Silliman University by Presbyterian missionaries and the Philippine Normal School (PNS) in 1901 and the University of the Philippines (U.P.) in 1908, as well as of English newspapers like the Daily Bulletin (1900), The Cablenews (1902), and the Philippines Free Press (1905), helped boost English usage. The first ten years of the century witnessed the first verse and prose efforts of Filipinos in student publications such as The Filipino Students’ Magazine first issue, 1905, a short-lived quarterly published in Berkeley, California, by Filipino pensionados (or government scholars); the U.P. College Folio (first issue, 1910); The Coconut of the Manila High School (first issue, 1912); and The Torch of the PNS (first issue, 1913).

However, the beginnings of anything resembling a professional market for writing in English would not be realized until the 1920s with the founding of other newspapers and magazines like the Philippines Herald in 1920, the Philippine Education Magazine in 1924 (renamed Philippine Magazine in 1928), and later the Manila Tribune, the Graphic, Woman's Outlook, and Woman's Home Journal. The publications helped introduce the reading public to the works of Paz Márquez-Benítez, José García Villa, Loreto Paras, Luis Dato, and Casiano Calalang, among others. Cash incentives were given to writers in 1921 when the Free Press started to pay for published contributions and awarded ₱1,000 for the best stories. The organization in 1925 of the Philippine Writers Association and in 1927 of the University of the Philippines National Writers Workshop, which put out the Literary Apprentice, also helped encourage literary production. In 1939, the Philippine Writers League was put up by politically conscious writers, intensifying their debate with those in the "art for art's sake" school of Villa.

Among the significant publications of this fertile period were:
 Filipino Poetry (1924) by Rodolfo Dato;
Manila A Collection of Verse (1926) by Luis Dato
 English-German Anthology of Filipino Poets (1934) by Pablo Laslo;
 José García Villa's Many Voices (1939) and Poems of Doveglion (1941);
 Poems (1940) by Angela Manalang-Gloria;
 Chorus for America: Six Philippine Poets (1942) by Carlos Bulosan;
 Zoilo Galang's A Child of Sorrow (1921), the first Filipino novel in English, and Box of Ashes and Other Stories (1925), the first collection of stories in book form;
 Villa’s Footnote to Youth: Tales of the Philippines and Others (1933);
 "The Wound and the Scar" (1937) by Arturo Rotor, a collection of stories;
 "Winds of April" (1940) by N. V. M. Gonzalez;
 "His Native Soil" (1941) by Juan C. Laya;
 Manuel Arguilla's "How My Brother Leon Brought Home a Wife and Other Stories" (1941);
 Galang's "Life and Success" (1921), the first volume of essays in English; and
 the influential "Literature and Society" (1940) by Salvador P. López.

Dramatic writing took a backseat due to the popularity of Filipino vaudeville (bodabil) and Tagalog movies, although it was kept alive by the playwright Wilfredo Ma. Guerrero.

The post-war period
During the Japanese occupation, when Tagalog was favored by the Japanese military authority, writing in English was consigned to limbo, since most of the English writers were forced to write in Tagalog or joined in the underground and wrote English stories based on the battles to serve as propaganda pieces in boosting the morale of the guerrillas. It picked up after the war, however, with a fervor and drive for excellence that continue to this day. Stevan Javellana's "Without Seeing the Dawn" (1947), the first postwar novel in English, was published in the United States. In 1946, the Barangay Writers Project was founded to help publish books in English..

Against a background marked by political unrest and government battles with Hukbalahap guerrillas, writers in English in the postwar period honed their sense of craft and techniques. Among the writers who came into their own during this time were, among many others:

 Carlos Bulosan (1913–1956)
 Linda Ty Casper (b. 1931)
 Gilda Cordero-Fernando (b. 1932)
 Amador Daguio
 Ricaredo Serrano
 N. V. M. Gonzalez (1915–1999)
 Sinai C. Hamada
 Alejandrino Hufana
 Dominador Ilio
 Nick Joaquin (1917–2004)
 F. Sionil José (1924–2022)
 Virginia Moreno (b. 1925)
 Peter Solis Nery (b. 1969)
 Vicente Rivera Jr.
 Alejandro R. Roces (1924–2011)
 Bienvenido Santos (1911–1996)
 Abelardo and Tarrosa Subido
 Edilberto K. Tiempo (1913–1996)
 Kerima Polotan Tuvera (1925–2011)
 Manuel A. Viray
 Raul Rafael R. Ingles
 Oscar de Zuñiga

Fresh from studies in American universities, usually as Fulbright or Rockefeller scholars, a number of these writers introduced New Criticism to the country and applied its tenets in literature classes and writing workshops. In this way were born the Silliman National Writers Workshop.

Literary awards and competitions
In 1940, the first Commonwealth Literary Awards were given by President Manuel L. Quezon to Salvador P. Lopez for "Literature and Society" (essay), Manuel Arguilla for "How My Brother Leon Brought Home a Wife and Other Stories" (short story), R. Zulueta da Costa for "Like the Molave" (poetry), and Juan C. Laya for "His Native Soil" (novel).

Government recognition of literary merit came in the form of the Republic Cultural Heritage Awards (1960), the Pro Patria Awards for Literature (1961), and the National Artist Awards (1973). Only the last of these three awards survives today. Writers in English who have received the National Artist award include: Jose Garcia Villa (1973), Nick Joaquin (1976), Carlos P. Romulo (1982), Francisco Arcellana (1990), N. V. M. Gonzalez, Rolando Tinio (1997), Edith L. Tiempo, (2000), F. Sionil José (2003), and Bienvenido Lumbera (2006).

A select group of local writers have also received the international Magsaysay Award, namely, F. Sionil José, Nick Joaquin and Bienvenido Lumbera.

Contemporary Writers

Despite the lack of a professional writer's market, poetry and fiction in English continue to thrive and be written with sophistication and insight. Among the fictionists of recent years are:

 Dean Francis Alfar
 Cecilia Manguerra Brainard
 Linda Ty Casper
 Ian Casocot
 Erwin Castillo
 Gilbert Luis R. Centina III
 Jose Dalisay Jr.
 Leoncio Deriada
 Buenaventura S. Medina Jr.
 Antonio Enriquez
 Eric Gamalinda
 Vicente Garcia Groyon
 Amadis Ma. Guerrero
 F. Sionil José
 Luis Joaquin Katigbak
 Ma. Francezca Kwe
 Angelo Rodriguez Lacuesta
 Susan Lara
 Jaime An Lim
 Issh Gajo
 Carmelo S.J. Juinio
 Rosario Cruz Lucero
 Renato Madrid
 Jesus Q. Cruz
 Resil Mojares
 Timothy Montes
 Peter Solis Nery
 Wilfredo Nolledo
 Charlson Ong
 Ninotchka Rosca
 Menchu Aquino Sarmiento
 Lakambini Sitoy
 Katrina Tuvera
 Alfred A. Yuson
 Jessica Zafra

Poets include:

 Jolico Cuadra
 Luis Francia
 Gemino Abad
 Alexis Abola
 Merlie Alunan
 Cirilo Bautista
 Gilbert Luis R. Centina III
 Salvador Bernal
 Hilario Francia
 José Wendell Capili
 Elsa Coscoluella
 Ricardo de Ungria
 Lourd Ernest De Veyra
 Ophelia Alcantara Dimalanta
 Simeon Dumdum, Jr.
 Federico Licsi Espino Jr.
 Marjorie Evasco
 J. Neil C. Garcia
 Ramil Digal Gulle
 Ma. Luisa Igloria
 Mookie Katigbak
 Marne Kilates
 Emmanuel Lacaba
 Paolo Manalo
 Peter Solis Nery
 Danton Remoto
 Angelo Suarez
 Ramon Sunico
 Juaniyo Arcellana
 Anthony Tan
 Joel Toledo
 Emmanuel Torres
 Naya Valdellon
 Edwin Cordevilla
 Clovis Nazareno

See also

 Literature of the Philippines
 Philippine literature in Spanish
 Philippine Literature in Filipino and/or other Philippine languages
 Philippine English
 List of countries where English is an official language
 List of countries by English-speaking population

References
 De Ungria, Ricardo M. "Philippine Literature in English"
 Quindoza-Santiago, Dr. Lilia. "Philippine Literature during the American Period" Retrieved August 26, 2005.
 Enriquez, Amee R. "The Writer's Life : The Chick Who Writes Chick Lit" Patron Ida Yap, Interactive Reading – Responding to and Writing about Philippine Literature

External links
 Linh Dinh interviewing Marianne Villanueva about *contemporary Philippine poetry
MAGKWENTO: The Philippine Anglophone Literature List

English, Literature in
English-language literature
Philippine English